Baron Wolf von Frankenstein is a fictional character who appears in the 1939  Universal film Son of Frankenstein. He is played by Basil Rathbone.

History
Wolf Frankenstein is the younger son of Henry Frankenstein and brother to Ludwig Frankenstein. He was sent to England when he was very young to receive a proper education. After obtaining his doctoral degree, marrying his girlfriend Elsa, and fathering a son named Peter, he moved to America and began a medical practice where he could live and breathe freely from the bad reputation that came with his family name. However, his father's history caught up with him eventually when Henry finally died leaving his entire estate to Wolf (one can assume that the estate was originally supposed to go to Ludwig, who, true to his disdain for Henry's work, refused it, dumping the burden on his brother).

Having spent most of his life away from his ancestral home, Wolf didn't know the whole story of how his father had created the monster, and assumed that the story had become grossly exaggerated over the years. thus, his only reason for accepting the Frankenstein estate was in the hopes of clearing the family name (making him the first of many well-intentioned by nonetheless doomed descendants of Henry) by proving to the people of Frankenstein that his father's work was, at its core, good. Initially this seemed doomed to failure, as everyone in town - with the exception of the open-minded police officer Inspector Krogh - was openly hostile towards Wolf and his family.

Regardless, Wolf soldiered on, setting up shop in Henry's old laboratory, during which time he discovered that an old demented man named Ygor (who has a deformed neck upon surviving a hanging upon his graverobbing attempts) had been using the heretofore-abandoned building as a sanctuary. After almost killing one another, Wolf and Ygor seemed to become fast friends, with the old man revealing that not only was his father's creation alive since the destruction of the laboratory in Henry's time, but that the Monster was living in the Frankenstein family crypt and was in poor health. Wolf then sees that his father were buried with the chalk writing on his stone casket stating "Henrich von Frankenstein: Maker of Monsters". Seeing this as an opportunity to fulfill his dream of redeeming his family, Wolf agreed to help Ygor restore the Monster to full health, little knowing that Ygor had sinister plans of his own for the bolt-necked giant. Wolf starts out by using the torch to etch out the word "Monsters" on the casket and write "Men" in its place.

These plans eventually came to light following the disappearance of Wolf's butler Thomas Benson (whom Wolf suspected that the increasingly hostile Ygor) had murdered. Following the deaths of Emil Lang and Edwald Niemuller at the hands of the Monster, Inspector Krogh came calling with dire news: the townspeople rightly blamed Ygor for the killings, but were accusing Wolf of harboring the madman.

Realizing that Ygor had lied to him (and concluding that Ygor had in fact killed Benson), Wolf went to the lab to confront him. Ygor knew why Wolf was there and attacked him with a hammer. But Wolf, better armed than his foe, shot Ygor with a revolver and seemingly killed him. Thinking the horror was over, he returned to Krogh, only to find that the Monster (in an effort to avenge the seeming death of his friend) had kidnapped Peter and was threatening to drop the boy into the sulphur pits that existed beneath the laboratory. Thanks to the efforts of Krogh, Peter was saved and Wolf swung on a rope and knocked the Monster into the sulphur instead.

After all this, Wolf decided to move back to America with Elsa and Peter. Wolf later handed the keys to the Frankenstein estate over to the townspeople.

Wolf was later mentioned in the 1942 film The Ghost of Frankenstein where Ludwig had heard about his brother's encounter with the monster.

References

Frankenstein, Wolf
Frankenstein (Universal film series) characters
Film characters introduced in 1939
Male horror film characters
Universal Monsters characters